The University of North Florida School of Music is the music department of the University of North Florida, and one of the institution's flagship programs. Part of UNF's College of Arts and Sciences, it offers seven programs of study, the most noted of which is the jazz studies program, founded by the jazz euphonium player Rich Matteson in 1987. The department boasts several award-winning ensembles, including the Jazz Ensemble 1, which has performed at jazz festivals across the United States and internationally and has won several awards and been recognized in Down Beat Magazine, Cadence, and the Jazz Times.

Fine Arts Center 

The UNF School of Music is housed in the Fine Arts Center on campus. It was opened in 2001 at a cost of $22 million. The complex comprises the 1,400 seat Lazzara Performance Hall, a 200-seat recital hall, 44 individual practice rooms, and 4 large rehearsal rooms. The Lazzara Performance Hall hosts performances throughout the year from national and international acts.

Faculty 
Danny Gottlieb - Drumset, Jazz Combos
Lynne Arriale - Piano, Jazz Combos
 Dave Steinmeyer - Jazz Trombone, Adjunct

Great American Jazz Series 
Throughout the year, UNF hosts world-famous jazz artists in a concert series known as the Great American Jazz Series. Typically, the visiting artists will spend the week leading up to the concert in residence at the school, giving several clinics and master classes throughout the week.

Some past GAJS artists include Wynton Marsalis, Pat Martino, Eddie Gómez, Jimmy Cobb, Mike Stern, Dave Weckl, Dave Brubeck, Herbie Hancock, Joe Henderson, Michael Brecker, Vanguard Jazz Orchestra, Arturo Sandoval, Pat Metheny, Yellowjackets, Dave Holland, Kevin Mahogany, Jimmy Heath, Bela Fleck and the Flecktones, and many others.

References

External links
UNF Department of Music
UNF Music Faculty
Lynne Arriale
Barry Greene
Clarence Hines
Danny Gottlieb
Barry Green, Dennis Marks, and Danny Gottlieb performing at WUCF Studios
Barry Greene with UNF students at the 2007 Nantes Jazz Festival in Nantes, France

Educational institutions established in 1972
University of North Florida
1972 establishments in Florida
Jazz festivals in the United States